The Breakup Guru is a 2014 Chinese romantic-comedy-drama film directed by Deng Chao and Yu Baimei and also starring Deng Chao and Yang Mi. The film was released on June 27, 2014.

Plot
Mei Yuangui (Deng Chao), a professional 'Breakup Guru', who is hired by a client to end a relationship with Ye Xiaochun (Yang Mi). But his penchant and skill at breaking up couples without complication and worry is put to the test when a battle of wits ensues with Xiao Zhuang (Guli Nazha), risking his reputation and setting up the ultimate test of his services!

Cast
 Deng Chao as Mei Yuan Gui
 Yang Mi as Xiao Chun Ye
 Guli Nazha as Xiao Zhuang
 Liu Yan as Madam Tang
 Sun Li as herself

Reception
The film has earned US$107,440,000 in China. It earned a total of  worldwide.

On Film Business Asia, Derek Elley gave the film a grade of 6 out of 10.

References

External links
 

2014 films
Chinese romantic comedy-drama films
Chinese films based on plays
Films set in Beijing
Films set in Mauritius
Films shot in Beijing
Films shot in Mauritius
2014 romantic comedy-drama films
2014 directorial debut films
2014 comedy films
2014 drama films
Films directed by Chao Deng
Films directed by Baimei Yu
2010s Mandarin-language films